Petr Nárožný (born 14 April 1938)) is a Czech actor, television presenter, comedian, and entertainer.

Life and career
As a boy, Nárožný spent part of World War II in Germany, where he experienced Allied bombings. He graduated from the Faculty of Civil Engineering at the Czech Technical University in Prague in 1968. The year of his graduation, he began working as a moderator and entertainer at concerts for the band Rangers.
From 1973, he was engaged as an actor at Semafor Theatre in Prague, forming a trio with Luděk Sobota and Miloslav Šimek. In 1980, he became a member of The Drama Club.

Since 1974, Nárožný has appeared in numerous films and television productions, starting with the comedy Jáchyme, hoď ho do stroje! and including the TV series Sanitka and Hospoda.

Večerníček
Nárožný has narrated several series of the Večerníček children's television program, most notably Mach a Šebestová and Žofka a spol.

Selected filmography

Film

References

External links
 

1938 births
Czech comedians
Living people
Czech Technical University in Prague alumni
Male actors from Prague
Czech male stage actors
Czech male film actors
Czech male television actors
Czech television presenters